This is a list of defunct airlines of Tonga.

See also
 List of airlines of Tonga
 List of airports in Tonga

References

Tonga
Airlines
Airlines, defunct